Dil Ka Kya Kasoor is a 1992 Indian Hindi-language musical melodrama film directed by Lawrence D'Souza. It stars Divya Bharti and debutant Prithvi with Suresh Oberoi, Sanam and Laxmikant Berde in supporting roles. The music of the film, from the duo Nadeem-Shravan, was an instant hit due to its catchy melodies.

Plot 
Shalini is the only sister of a rich businessman, Rajesh Saxena,, who is a much older character in the movie, and more like a father figure to his sister Shalini. Shalini falls in love with her classmate, Arun Kumar after he performs a song which was authored by her under a pseudonym. But she doesn't tell Arun about this because he doesn't like her; he thinks Shalini is a spoiled rich girl; she had behaved thus a few times with him and some others. Without disclosing his own identity or purpose, Shalini's brother Rajesh goes to meet Arun, only to find out that he is an orphan, is from an underprivileged background and is living in a hostel room, since he doesn't have a house of his own. Arun also rejects any help from Rajesh, as he would prefer to face the world on his own.

Rajesh tells Shalini that he will only arrange her marriage to Arun if Arun reaches a status in society comparable to theirs. Shalini knows that Arun is a good singer because he often sings at college functions and decides to confess her love when Arun becomes what he deserves as she neither wanted to make her love bondage for Arun nor wanted to go against her brother. She tells her friend, Madhu, to use her money to start up a music/stage production company and indirectly encourages Arun to become a singer. She starts writing songs for Arun Kumar (without publishing them elsewhere), but still prefers to remain anonymous. Arun gets these songs from an editor, Mr. Verma, who tells him that these songs are written by a girl called Seema (who wishes to stay anonymous). Through her songs, Arun becomes popular and wealthy in a short while and wants to express his gratitude by meeting her, but Mr. Verma maintains Seema's anonymity, allowing Arun to correspond via letters.

Finally, Shalini's brother is ready to get her married to (a very successful) Arun, and also announces his intention to Shalini. But they soon find out that Arun has married the principal's daughter, Meena. The marriage was not the culmination of any romance, rather the apt thing to do when the principal, who was a mentor to Arun, suddenly died, leaving his lone daughter behind without any support.

Shalini then decides to remain unmarried for the rest of her life. However due to her love being remained unrequited and the heartbreak caused by it her health gradually deteriorates and she is hospitalized due to patches detected in her lungs. Mr. Verma tells Arun that Seema is in the hospital and about to die. He goes to the hospital, only to find out that Seema is none other than Shalini. He tells her wife about Shalini and they go to the hospital together, where Arun symbolically accepts Shalini as his wife (on being encouraged by Meena), but Shalini soon passes way. A daughter is born to the pregnant Meena, who's named Seema, to honor the memory of Shalini.

Cast 
Divya Bharti as Shalini Saxena / Seema
Prithvi Vazir as Arun Kumar
 Sanam as Meena
Suresh Oberoi as Rajesh Saxena
 Laxmikant Berde as Murli
 Satyendra Kapoor as Kaka
 Shehnaz Kudia as Shalini's friend
 Kishore Anand Bhanushali as Kishore Anand

Reception
The film was a musical bonanza, but failed to create an impact at the box office becoming a box office bomb. Despite its failure, the performance of Divya Bharti as the main protagonist received praise and is considered one of her Best Performances.

Soundtrack 
The music for all the songs was composed by Nadeem-Shravan. The title track and "Mera Sanam Sabse Pyara Hai" were popular numbers. Most of the songs are sung by Kumar Sanu. Other singers who lent their voices are Asha Bhosle, Sadhana Sargam, Alka Yagnik, Udit Narayan.

The song "Ga Raha Hoon Is Mehfil Mein" is copy of song "Na Koi Gila Hai" sung by Mehdi Hassan from a Pakistani movie named Zanjeer (1975) composed by M. Ashraf.

References

External links 
 

1992 films
1990s Hindi-language films
Films scored by Nadeem–Shravan
Films directed by Lawrence D'Souza